Astragalus malacus is a species of milkvetch known by the common name shaggy milkvetch. It is native to the Great Basin in the western United States.

Description
Astragalus malacus is perennial herb growing upright to a maximum height near 40 centimeters. Its leaves are up to 15 centimeters long and are made up of many oval-shaped leaflets. The inflorescence bears up to 35 magenta flowers, each up to 2 centimeters long. Stem, leaves, inflorescence, and sepals are coated in long, white hairs. The fruit is a densely hairy, papery legume pod up to 4 centimeters in length.

External links
Jepson Manual Treatment - Astragalus malacus
USDA Plants Profile
Astragalus malacus - Photo gallery

malacus
Flora of Idaho
Flora of Nevada
Flora of Oregon
Flora of the Great Basin
Flora of the California desert regions
Flora without expected TNC conservation status